Tentamun or Tentamen (t3-n.t-ỉmn; "she of Amun") is an ancient Egyptian feminine name. Its notable bearers are:

 Tentamun (18th dynasty), a princess of the 18th dynasty, daughter of Thutmose IV
 Tentamun (20th dynasty), a queen of the 20th dynasty, probably the wife of Ramesses XI
 Tentamun (21st dynasty), a princess and queen of the 21st dynasty, wife of Smendes, probably the daughter of Ramesses XI

Sources

Ancient Egyptian given names
Theophoric names